The Vicente Suárez Shooting Range was a temporary firing range constructed in Campo Militar 1 for the 1968 Summer Olympics. During those games, it hosted all of the shooting events, the first time the competitions took place at the same location since 1928. It also hosted the shooting part of the modern pentathlon competition.

References
1968 Summer Olympics official report. Volume 2. Part 1. pp. 74–75.

Venues of the 1968 Summer Olympics
Defunct sports venues in Mexico
Olympic modern pentathlon venues
Olympic shooting venues